The 2002–03 NBA season was the Bulls' 37th season in the National Basketball Association. In the 2002 NBA draft, the Bulls selected Jay Williams out of Duke University with the second overall pick. During the off-season, the team signed free agent Donyell Marshall. After a 4–6 start to the season, the Bulls went on a nine-game losing streak between November and December. The Bulls finished sixth in the Central Division with a 30–52 record. They also posted a franchise worst road record of 3–38. Jalen Rose led the team in scoring with 22.1 points per game, while Marshall provided the team with 13.4 points and 9.0 rebounds per game. Williams averaged 9.5 points and 4.7 assists per game, and was named to the NBA All-Rookie Second Team. Following the season, Williams suffered a career-ending motorcycle accident, while guards Trenton Hassell and Fred Hoiberg both signed as free agents with the Minnesota Timberwolves. (See 2002–03 Chicago Bulls season#Regular season)

Offseason

NBA Draft

Roster

Regular season

The Bulls entered the 2002-03 NBA season with an eager sense of anticipation on what the prior year’s moves would become.

Jalen Rose was expected to have a big year in his first full season with the club. The addition of Jay Williams, selected by the Bulls with the second overall pick in 2002 NBA Draft, was expected to provide the team with an extra scoring punch. Plus, the team’s two young big men, Tyson Chandler and Eddy Curry, each had a valuable year of pro experience under their belts.

General Manager Jerry Krause had what many considered at the time to be a very successful offseason. Besides Williams, the Bulls also added Roger Mason, Jr. and Lonny Baxter via the draft. Veteran forward Donyell Marshall—signed with the team’s mid-level exception—brought size and versatility to the team, and the shape of a solid squad was beginning to form.

In the end, though, having Rose, Marshall and an abundance of talented youth did not equate to winning games. After starting the season 2–0 for the first time since the 1996–97 campaign, Chicago garnered a franchise-worst 3–38 road record. The Bulls held a 19–game road losing streak from 11/02/02–01/18/03 and the team’s 30–52 record qualified it for a fifth–consecutive NBA Draft Lottery appearance.

The franchise was ready to head in a new direction and the beginning of that movement started with the resignation of long–time executive Jerry Krause on April 7. Krause, then 64, played a major role in building Bulls World Championship teams and was a two–time NBA Executive of the Year.

“Jerry Krause is one of a kind,” Bulls Chairman Jerry Reinsdorf stated. “He brought with him a vision of how to build a champion and he proceeded to create one of the most dominant champions of all time. No basketball fan in America can begin to imagine the World Champion Chicago Bulls without his imprint.”

One week later, the Bulls named John Paxson EVP of Basketball Operations. Paxson had spent the previous seven seasons as a color analyst on both the Bulls Radio and TV networks, providing expert analysis to the broadcasts. He spent one season (1995–96) as Assistant Coach, helping the Bulls to a then NBA-record 72–10 record and the 1996 NBA Finals.

“I am really excited to accept this challenge and look forward to working with the basketball operations staff,” said Paxson. “The Bulls organization has meant a lot to me over the years, and getting the chance to help lead the team back to the upper echelon of the NBA is a true honor.”

Other Notes: Jay Williams authored his first career triple–double, recording season highs of 26 points, 14 rebounds and 13 assists in 45 minutes versus New Jersey (11/9) … Marcus Fizer suffered a torn ACL at Portland on 01/31/03 and was forced to miss the final 36 games of the season … Chicago appeared in a franchise-record nine overtime games (1–8).

Honors: Tyson Chandler (sophomore team) participated in the Schick Rookie Challenge at All-Star Weekend … Jay Williams was named the NBA’s “got milk?” Rookie of the Month for December … Williams (freshman team) also participated in the Schick Rookie Challenge at All-Star Weekend and was named to the got milk? NBA All–Rookie Second Team … Eddy Curry led the league in field goal percentage with .585 shooting from the floor … the Bulls drew an average of 19,617 fans through 41 home games (fifth in the NBA in attendance) and had 20 home crowds of 20,000+ (14–6 record), including 12 sellouts.

Season standings

Record vs. opponents

Player statistics

Season

Awards and records
 Jay Williams, NBA All-Rookie Team 2nd Team

Transactions

References

External links

See also
 2002–03 NBA season

Chicago Bulls seasons
Chicago
Chicago
Chicago